Firth River is a major river in Yukon, Canada. It begins at the east side of Davidson Mountains and flows into the Beaufort Sea of the Arctic Ocean, just south of Herschel Island.

References

Rivers of North Slope Borough, Alaska
Rivers of Alaska
Rivers of Yukon